Edward Albert Lassen (12 August 1876 – 14 August 1938) was an English amateur golfer. He won the Amateur Championship in 1908.

Lassen was a surprise winner of the 1908 Amateur Championship but in the period up until the start of World War I he was one of the leading amateur golfers. He was runner-up in the 1911 Amateur Championship, losing to Harold Hilton in the final. He was also Yorkshire Amateur Championship four times between 1908 and 1914. He played for England against Scotland in the annual amateur match in 1909, 1910, 1911, and 1912 and for the amateurs against the professionals in the 1911 Coronation Match.

Lassen qualified for the Open Championship five times between 1909 and 1914. In 1909 he finished tied for 10th and was the leading amateur. He also had top-20 finishes in 1913 and 1914, being the second amateur on each occasion. In 1909 he started with an 82 but two rounds of 74 lifted him to sixth place, before a final round of 78 left him in tenth place.

Lassen was a useful local chess player. He beat José Raúl Capablanca in a simultaneous exhibition in Bradford.

He was a stuff merchant by occupation, although he got into financial difficulties in the late-1920s.

Amateur wins
1900 Yorkshire Amateur Championship
1908 Amateur Championship, Yorkshire Amateur Championship
1909 Yorkshire Amateur Championship
1913 Yorkshire Amateur Championship
1914 Yorkshire Amateur Championship

Major championships

Wins (1)

Results timeline

Note: Lassen only played in The Open Championship.

LA = Low amateur
CUT = missed the half-way cut
"T" indicates a tie for a place

Team appearances
Coronation Match (representing the Amateurs): 1911
England–Scotland Amateur Match (representing England): 1909, 1910 (winners), 1911, 1912

References

English male golfers
Amateur golfers
Sportspeople from Bradford
1876 births
1938 deaths